Tiparra or Tipara is a name associated with an area south of Moonta on Yorke Peninsula in South Australia. Uses of the word include:
Hundred of Tiparra
 The Hundred of Tiparra School in Winulta opened in 1884 and was renamed Winulta School in 1891,
 Tiparra Bay off the coast of Nalyappa, also previously known as Baie Duguesclin
 Tiparra Reef in the middle of the bay
 Tiparra Springs in Nalyappa